The Fisker EMotion is an all-electric sports sedan concept car designed by Henrik Fisker for Fisker Inc. It is the second car produced by Fisker, who in 2011 produced the Fisker Karma with Fisker Automotive.

Presentation 
EMotion refers to the capital "E" symbolizes the electric energy which propels it and the word "Motion" for "Movement" (in English). According to Henrik Fisker, EMotion is the "spiritual successor" of Fisker Karma.

The car was intended to be marketed in early 2019, primarily in the United States and Canada, before a worldwide commercial launch. It was projected to be a direct competitor of the Tesla Model S and the Lucid Air. However, production has not begun as of May 2020.

References

Full-size vehicles
Luxury vehicles
Plug-in hybrid vehicles
Electric concept cars
Sports sedans
2020s cars
Henrik Fisker